Nazanin Vaseghpanah (born 29 May 1987) is a Swedish futsal player who plays for the Sweden women's national futsal team.

Club career
Vaseghpanah has previously played for AIK and Hammarby in the Damallsvenskan, where she was nominated in the Fotbollsgalan in 2008.

International career
Vaseghpanah has played for the Swedish women's national futsal team and was one of the leading scorers in the preliminary round of the UEFA Women's Futsal Euro 2019.

Club statistics

References

External links
UEFA profile
SvFF profile

1987 births
Living people
Sportspeople from Tehran
Iranian women's footballers
Iranian women's futsal players
Iranian emigrants to Sweden
Naturalized citizens of Sweden
Swedish women's footballers
Swedish women's futsal players
Swedish people of Iranian descent
Sportspeople of Iranian descent
Damallsvenskan players
AIK Fotboll (women) players
Hammarby Fotboll (women) players
Sweden women's international footballers
Women's association footballers not categorized by position